Helfferich is a surname. Notable people with the surname include:

 Merritt Randolph Helfferich, worker in Antarctica after whom Helfferich Glacier was named
 Karl Helfferich (1872–1924), German politician, economist, and financier

See also
 Helfrich
 Helferich